Reelika Vaher (born 30 August 1978) is an Estonian former footballer who played as a midfielder for the Estonia women's national team.

Career
Vaher played in the first ever official match for Estonia, against Lithuania. In 2007, she was voted as Estonian Female Footballer of the Year.

Personal life
In her youth, Vaher took up swimming as a hobby. She was an amateur footballer and trained with her club about three or four times a week. She worked for Sampo Group as a loan manager as her main source of income.

References

1978 births
Living people
Women's association football midfielders
Estonian women's footballers
Estonia women's international footballers
Sportspeople from Pärnu